Hereketa İslamiya Kurdistane was a Kurdish (Sunni) Islamist movement in southeastern Turkey. It movement was established in 1993 led by Seyda Mele Abdullah. Movement is no longer active, it was merged with CIK organization in 2004.

The organisation is not listed among the 12 active terrorist organisation in Turkey as of 2007 according to Counter-Terrorism and Operations Department of Directorate General for Security (Turkish police).

See also
 List of illegal political parties in Turkey

References

1993 establishments in Turkey
2004 disestablishments in Turkey
Political parties established in 1993
Political parties disestablished in 2004
Banned Islamist parties in Turkey
Banned Kurdish parties in Turkey
Kurdish Islamic organisations
Kurdish Islamism
Islamic organizations based in Turkey
Kurdish separatism in Turkey
Islamism in Turkey
Rebel groups in Turkey
Defunct Kurdish parties in Turkey